Jackson Township is a township in Crittenden County, Arkansas, United States. Its total population was 1,352 as of the 2010 United States Census, a decrease of 1.24 percent from 1,369 at the 2000 census.

According to the 2010 Census, Jackson Township is located at  (35.206155, -90.334483).

Crawfordsville, and parts of Marion, West Memphis, and Jennette are located within the township.

References

External links 

Townships in Arkansas
Townships in Crittenden County, Arkansas